Christian Ahrens (born July 24, 1976 in Iowa City, Iowa) is a former American rower.  He is a dual Olympian, an Olympic gold medal winner, and a four-time world champion.

Early life 
Ahrens was born in Iowa City, Iowa, on July 24, 1976, to Gary and Patricia Ahrens. His father, Gary, had rowed in high school and at Milwaukee Rowing Club. When Christian was only six years old, his father began teaching him how to row in a flat-bottom boat tied to a clothesline on the Milwaukee River. He began rowing more seriously his freshman year of high school, again coached by his father, after deciding that he "wasn't going to go anywhere in swimming."

College
Ahrens is a 1998 graduate of Princeton University who rowed for the Princeton Tigers and the United States national team. He was honored by The Daily Princetonian as the 18th most successful athlete in the school's history.

International rowing career
Ahrens stroked the gold medal winning United States men's eight at the 1997, 1998, and 1999 world championships, and was in the six seat for their fifth place  2000 Sydney Olympic boat. Ahrens came out of retirement in 2004 to join the US Olympic squad in the three seat of the gold medal winning boat. This boat was notable not only for being the first US eight to win Olympic gold since 1964, but it also set a new course and world record of 5:19.85. That world best time stood until a Canadian eight took half a second off it in 2012.

Ahrens retired from international rowing immediately upon crossing the finish line at the 2004 Olympics. He lives in Brooklyn with his wife and two daughters.

References

1976 births
Living people
Princeton University alumni
Rowers at the 2000 Summer Olympics
Rowers at the 2004 Summer Olympics
Olympic gold medalists for the United States in rowing
American male rowers
Medalists at the 2004 Summer Olympics
World Rowing Championships medalists for the United States
Sportspeople from Brooklyn